Jonathan Benair (July 4, 1950 – June 29, 1998) was an American actor who did the voice of the Black and White TV in the animated film The Brave Little Toaster and Jim Bob in The Brave Little Toaster to the Rescue, the latter of which was released posthumously.

Early life
Jonathan Benair was born on July 4, 1950, in Los Angeles, the son of Zvi Benair and Muriel (née Dubov). Benair had one brother, Daniel.

Career
Benair did very few acting roles and had an independent career. He had played roles in Hollywood Game, The Brave Little Toaster and The Brave Little Toaster to the Rescue, his final acting role. Benair was also a screenwriter, having sold three movie scripts, and contributed articles to Movieline, the Los Angeles Reader and L.A. Style.

He worked as a film programmer for the Los Angeles County of Museum Art for eight years during the 1970s and 1980s, and was a member of the Writers Guild of America and the British Academy of Film and Television Arts. An amateur film historian, Benair would talk frequently at film festivals, offering his knowledge of cinema to writers who wanted his assistance.

Death
On June 28, 1998, Benair died of a cerebral hemorrhage and heart attack in Van Nuys, California at age 47, six days shy of his 48th birthday.

Filmography

Film

References

External links

1950 births
1998 deaths
American male voice actors
Place of birth missing
20th-century American male actors
Burials at Hillside Memorial Park Cemetery